The 2002 IIFA Awards, officially known as the 3rd International Indian Film Academy Awards  ceremony, presented by the International Indian Film Academy honored the best films of 2001 and took place on 6 April 2002.

The official ceremony took place on 6 April 2002, at the Genting Highlands, in Arena of Stars. During the ceremony, IIFA Awards were awarded in 29 competitive categories.

The IIFA Weekend started with a Press Meet. Attended by the stars, the event received extensive coverage from world media. The same evening saw the music launch of Kaante. The IIFA Karaoke Party gave film stars and high-profile guests a chance to let their hair down.

IIFA hosted the World Premiere of the film Aankhen at the Genting International Showroom. Malaysia witnessed the first ever IIFA Forum. The focus was on the emerging perspectives of Indian Cinema, the exchange of technology and talent. The speakers included Ashutosh Gowarikar, Karan Johar, Farhan Akhtar and Madhur Bhandarkar.

Lagaan led the ceremony with 10 wins including Best Film, Best Director (for Ashutosh Gowariker) and Best Actor (for Aamir Khan), thus becoming the most-awarded film at the ceremony.

Aamir Khan received dual nominations for Best Actor for his performances in Dil Chahta Hai and Lagaan, winning for the latter.

Winners and nominees
Winners are listed first and highlighted in boldface.

Popular awards

Musical awards

Backstage awards

Technical awards

Special awards

Outstanding Contribution to Indian Cinema
 Sadhana

Outstanding Contribution In Indian Cinema
 Yash Chopra

Outstanding Achievement in International Cinema
 Mira Nair

Electrolux Kelvinator Personality of The Year
 Amitabh Bachchan

Sony Faces Of The Year
 Arjun Rampal
 Bipasha Basu
 Gracy Singh

References

External links

Iifa Awards
IIFA awards